Elvis Eduardo Hidrobo Amoroso (born 4 August 1963) is a Venezuelan politician and lawyer who currently serves as the Comptroller General of Venezuela as of 23 October 2018. He also holds the presidency of the Republican Moral Council (Spanish: Consejo Moral Republicano), also known as the Moral Power (Spanish: Poder Moral). In August 2017, he was elected as first and second vice president of the 2017 Constituent National Assembly and served until October 2017. He also served as a deputy to the National Assembly for the United Socialist Party of Venezuela (PSUV).

Political career 
In the parliamentary elections of 1993 he was elected Deputy to the Congress of the Republic of the Radical Cause by circuit 2 of the Aragua state within the VIII Legislature . He was re-elected in 1998 with the support of the Fifth Republic Movement (MVR) and Fatherland for All (PPT).

He served as secretary of the Commission Legislative National of 2000, where Alejandro Andrade served as undersecretary. He was a member of the parliamentary group of 2002 Group Boston and deputy of the National Assembly since 2006 of the United Socialist Party of Venezuela (PSUV), where he served as chairman of the Permanent Commission for Internal Policy of the Assembly in 2012 and as first vice president from 2015 to 2016.

In 2015, he ran as magistrate of the Supreme Court of Justice (TSJ) after losing re-election in the parliamentary elections of 6 December. However, the Venezuelan constitution and the Organic Law of the Supreme Court of Justice establish that to be a magistrate the lawyer must be at least 15 years old in the exercise of the law, a requirement that Amoroso did not meet because he graduated as a lawyer at the Bicentennial University of Aragua in 2006.

He was elected as first vice president of the 2017 National Constituent Assembly from 18 August to 27 October of the same year when he is appointed second vice president.

He is appointed by the ANC as Comptroller General of the Republic of Venezuela on 23 October 2018.

Personal life 
His son, Elvis Junior Amoroso is the Permanent Secretary (in charge) of the Council of Ministers of Venezuela.

Controversies

On Juan Guaidó 
Following Juan Guaidó's Latin American tour in February 2019, Amoroso alleged in March that Guaidó had not explained how he paid for the trip, and stated there were inconsistencies between his level of spending and income. Amoroso said that Guaidó's 90 trips abroad had cost $94,000, and that Guaidó had not explained the source of the funds. Based on these alleged financial discrepancies, Amoroso said Guaidó would be barred from running for public office for the maximum time allowed by law—fifteen years. Leopoldo López and Henrique Capriles had been prohibited from holding office by the Maduro administration on similar pretexts.

Guaidó responded that "The only body that can appoint a comptroller is the legitimate parliament." The comptroller general is not a judicial body; according to constitutional lawyer José Vicente Haro, the Inter-American Court of Human Rights ruled in 2011, after Leopoldo López was barred from holding office, that an administrative body cannot disallow a public servant from running. Constitutional law expert Juan Manuel Raffalli stated that Article 65 of Venezuela's Constitution provides that such determinations may only be made by criminal courts, after judgment of criminal activity. The decision would also breach Guaidó's parliamentary immunity.

Sanctions

Canada 
On 22 September 2017, Canada sanctioned Amoroso due to rupture of Venezuela's constitutional order following the 2017 Venezuelan Constituent Assembly election.

United States 
On 9 November 2017, Amoroso was sanctioned by the United States Office of Foreign Assets Control after the 2017 Venezuelan Constituent Assembly election.

Panama 
On 29 March 2018, Amoroso was sanctioned by the Panamanian government for his alleged involvement with "money laundering, financing of terrorism and financing the proliferation of weapons of mass destruction".

References 

1963 births
Living people
Members of the National Assembly (Venezuela)
20th-century Venezuelan lawyers
Radical Cause politicians
Fifth Republic Movement politicians
United Socialist Party of Venezuela politicians
People of the Crisis in Venezuela
People from Aragua
Members of the Venezuelan Constituent Assembly of 1999
Members of the Venezuelan Constituent Assembly of 2017